Karisma Kapoor (born 25 June 1974) is an Indian actress, who primarily works in Hindi films. A member of the Kapoor family, she is the daughter of actors Randhir Kapoor and Babita, and the elder sister of actress Kareena Kapoor. Kapoor is the recipient of several accolades, including a National Film Award and four Filmfare Awards.

Kapoor made her acting debut with the film Prem Qaidi in 1991 and subsequently played the leading lady in a number of box office hits, including Jigar (1992), Anari (1993), Raja Babu (1994), Coolie No. 1 (1995), Saajan Chale Sasural (1996), and Jeet (1996). Starring roles in the top-grossing romances Raja Hindustani (1996) and Dil To Pagal Hai (1997), established her as a star. She won the Filmfare Award for Best Actress for the former, and the National Film Award and the Filmfare Award for Best Supporting Actress for the latter.

Kapoor cemented her status by starring in five of David Dhawan's comedies—Judwaa (1997), Hero No.1 (1997), Biwi No.1 (1999), Haseena Maan Jaayegi (1999) and Dulhan Hum Le Jayenge (2000), and the family drama Hum Saath-Saath Hain (1999). In the early 2000s, Kapoor won the Best Actress and Best Actress (Critics) awards at Filmfare for her titular roles in the dramas Fiza (2000) and Zubeidaa (2001). She took a sabbatical from acting after leading the television soap opera Karishma: The Miracles of Destiny (2003–2004), and has since acted sporadically, starring in the thriller Dangerous Ishhq (2012) and the web series Mentalhood (2020).

Kapoor was married to businessman Sanjay Kapur from 2003 to 2016 – the couple have two children together. She has featured as a talent judge for several reality shows.

Early life and background 

Kapoor was born on 25 June 1974 in Mumbai, to actors Randhir Kapoor and Babita (née Shivdasani). Her younger sister, Kareena, is also a film actress. Her paternal grandfather was the actor and filmmaker Raj Kapoor, while her maternal grandfather was actor Hari Shivdasani. Her paternal great-grandfather was actor Prithviraj Kapoor. The actors Rishi and Rajiv Kapoor are her uncles, while the actress Neetu Singh and entrepreneur Ritu Nanda are her aunts. Her first cousins includes the actors Ranbir Kapoor, Armaan Jain and Aadar Jain, and Nikhil Nanda. The actors Shammi and Shashi Kapoor are her grand-uncles, and the late actress Sadhana was her mother's first cousin.

Kapoor is informally called as "Lolo" at her home. According to Kapoor, the name, Lolo, was derived after her mother made a passing reference to the Italian actress Gina Lollobrigida. Both of her paternal and maternal grandparents were from Peshawar, Lyallpur and Karachi respectively, who moved to Bombay for their film careers before the partition of India. Kapoor is of Punjabi Hindu descent on her father's side, and on her mother's side she is of Sindhi Hindu and British descent.

Particularly inspired by the work of actresses Sridevi and Madhuri Dixit, Kapoor was keen on pursuing acting since childhood. While growing up, Kapoor regularly attended award ceremonies and accompanied by her parents to film sets. However, despite her family background, her father disapproved of women working in films, because he believed it conflicted with the traditional maternal duties and responsibility of women in the family. This led to a conflict between her parents and they separated in 1988. She and her sister Kareena were raised by their mother, who worked several jobs to raise them, until she made her debut in films as an actress. The couple reconciled in 2007, after living separately for several years. Kapoor studied at the Cathedral and John Connon School and later, for a few months at Sophia College. Kapoor later said that she left college to pursue acting for financial support.

Career

Debut and early roles (1991-1996) 

Kapoor made her acting debut in 1991 at the age of 16 with the romantic drama Prem Qaidi, opposite debutant Harish Kumar. Upon release, the film emerged as a moderate box office success and received mixed reviews from critics, as did Kapoor's performance, with Taran Adarsh of Bollywood Hungama describing it as "mechanical". The following year, Kapoor's first five releases—Police Officer, Jaagruti, Nishchaiy, Sapne Sajan Ke and Deedar—flopped at the box office. Jaagruti and Nishchaiy marked her first two collaborations with Salman Khan, while Deedar marked her first collaboration with Akshay Kumar. She next starred in the action drama Jigar (1992), followed by the romantic drama Anari (1993), both of which emerged as box office hits and among the highest-grossing films of their respective years. Jigar marked Kapoor's first of several collaborations with Ajay Devgn, while Anari featured her in the leading role of Rajnandini, a princess who falls in love with her poor servant (played by Daggubati Venkatesh).

Kapoor's next four releases of 1993 were the dramas Muqabla (which marked first of her many collaborations with Govinda), Sangraam, Shaktiman and Dhanwaan. With the exception of Muqabla, none of these films performed well either critically or commercially. In 1994, Kapoor had nine film releases – four of them — Prem Shakti, Dulaara, Andaz and Aatish—were critical and commercial failures. Her first hit that year was David Dhawan's comedy film Raja Babu, opposite Govinda, in which she played Madhubala, an educated arrogant girl who calls off her engagement upon discovering her fiancée's illiteracy. Kapoor next played the blind wife of Govinda's character in the hit action drama Khuddar, following which she starred with Salman Khan, Aamir Khan and Raveena Tandon in Rajkumar Santoshi's acclaimed comedy film Andaz Apna Apna. Kapoor played Raveena Bajaj, the daughter of a London-based business tycoon, who travels to India in search of true love, and falls for Salman Khan's character. Although the film underperformed at the box office, it developed a significant cult following over the years since its release.

Kapoor's final two releases of the year were the action drama Suhaag (alongside Ajay Devgn, Akshay Kumar and Nagma) and the comedy-drama Gopi Kishan (alongside Suniel Shetty and Shilpa Shirodkar), both of which were critically and commercially successful. In the former, she starred as a college student and Devgn's love interest, while in the latter, she played a police commissioner's daughter who falls in love with a criminal. In 1995, after appearing in the box office flops Jawab and Maidan-E-Jung, Kapoor starred as Malti, a rich girl who marries a poor coolie (played by Govinda) in David Dhawan's blockbuster comedy film Coolie No. 1. The film garnered positive reviews and emerged as a commercial success, grossing  in India. On her initial career struggle, she later said:

When I first entered the industry, things were made tough for me. I am not saying that I was singled out. I think every star kid has to go through this. Everyone was so unfair to me. Other newcomers were praised for every little achievement, but I was not given an iota of acknowledgement. When it came to me, it was always, 'Okay, she has done well, but what's the big deal about her?'. Nobody gave a 17-year-old credit for doing my job reasonably well.

Breakthrough and rise to stardom (1996–1999) 
In 1996, Kapoor appeared in 10 films. Five of them—Papi Gudia, Megha, Bal Bramhachari, Sapoot and Rakshak—were commercially unsuccessful. Her next release was David Dhawan's romantic comedy Saajan Chale Sasural, co-starring Govinda and Tabu. Saajan Chale Sasural emerged as a commercial success. For her fifth release, Kapoor was paired opposite Suneil Shetty in S. Deepak's box office hit Krishna. She starred alongside Sunny Deol, Salman Khan and Tabu in Raj Kanwar's romantic drama Jeet. She played Kajal, a woman who falls in love with a criminal, but ends up marrying another man. Finishing up as the second highest-grossing film of the year, Jeet emerged as a "super-hit" at the box office. Critical reaction was positive on both the film as well as Kapoor's performance. That same year, Kapoor played the female lead in Dharmesh Darshan's romantic drama Raja Hindustani opposite Aamir Khan. The film emerged as the highest-grossing film of the year and she won her first Filmfare Award for Best Actress for her performance in the film – the film's success established Kapoor as a leading actress of Hindi cinema, and marked a significant turning point in her career. Kapoor's final release of 1996 was Suneel Darshan's action film Ajay, with Sunny Deol. The film was also a financial success.

In 1997, Kapoor re-united with David Dhawan for two projects, the comedy film Judwaa (alongside Salman Khan and Rambha), and the romantic comedy Hero No. 1 (opposite Govinda). The former's concept was similar to Gopi Kishan – it tells the story of twin brothers who are separated at birth and re-unite in their youth. Kapoor and Rambha played the love interests of Khan's characters. It was a moderate critical and commercial success. In Hero No. 1, she played Meena Nath, a girl who falls in love with Govinda's character while on a foreign trip, however, she finds it hard to convince her strict grandfather (Paresh Rawal) of this relationship. A major critical and commercial success, the film earned Kapoor praise for her portrayal. She eventually received a nomination for Zee Cine Award for Best Actress for her work in the film. She next starred in the Mehul Kumar-directed dramas Lahu Ke Do Rang and Mrityudata, both of which were critical and commercial failures. Kapoor's fifth and final release of 1997 was Yash Chopra's musical romantic drama Dil To Pagal Hai. Co-starring Shah Rukh Khan, Madhuri Dixit and Akshay Kumar, the film depicts the love lives of the cast and crew in a musical dance troupe. Kapoor played Nisha, a bubbly dancer who secretly falls in love with her best friend (played by Khan), however, she unites her with the girl he loves (played by Dixit). Initially hesitant to take on the part, Kapoor was cast by Chopra (after he was impressed by her work in Raja Hindustani) after several leading actresses of the time had put down the role. Dil To Pagal Hai emerged as a blockbuster at the box office and proved to be the highest-grossing film of the year. Kapoor eventually won the National Film Award and Filmfare Award for Best Supporting Actress for her role.

Her diminutive comeback in 1999 proved to be good as she took part in the year's most successful films. Kapoor starred in four hits. She next re-united with Dhawan and Salman Khan (alongside Sushmita Sen) for the romantic comedy Biwi No.1, in which she portrayed Pooja, a woman whose husband gets involved in an extra-marital affair with a model. The film, which emerged as a major commercial success, earned Kapoor critical praise for her performance. Mohammad Ali Ikram of Planet Bollywood commented: "Kapoor may not look like a mother of two offsprings, but she continues to mature as an actress with each successive film." Kapoor received a second Best Actress nomination at Filmfare for her work in the film. She proved to be successful with comedy films, as another of David Dhawan's films Haseena Maan Jaayegi, did fairly well at the box office. Kapoor collaborated for the first time with the Rajshri Productions for the family drama Hum Saath-Saath Hain: We Stand United. The film featured an ensemble cast (Mohnish Behl, Salman Khan, Saif Ali Khan, Tabu and Sonali Bendre), proving to be one of the biggest Hindi film successes of all time in the market, earning  worldwide. Her last release of the year, Jaanwar, opposite Akshay Kumar, was another box office hit, making her the most successful actress of the year.

Further acclaim and roles (2000–2002) 

Kapoor's first release of 2000 was Dhawan's romantic comedy Dulhan Hum Le Jayenge, opposite Salman Khan. She played Sapna, a girl who falls for Khan's character while on a foreign trip, however, she finds it tough to convince her three uncles of this relationship. The film finished up as one of the biggest hits of the year. Aparajita Saha of Rediff commented: "Karisma Kapoor and Salman Khan elicit more than their fair share of cat-calls in the movie and make a delectable pair. Both are in form – Karisma looks glamorous and at ease while Salman has perfected the lost-boy-muscle-man get-up". Kapoor's next two releases, the romantic comedies Chal Mere Bhai (opposite Khan and Dutt) and Hum To Mohabbat Karega (opposite Bobby Deol) failed to do well at the box office.

That same year, Kapoor won her second Filmfare Award for Best Actress for portraying the title role of a girl in search of her brother, in Khalid Mohammed's crime drama Fiza, a film which received critical acclaim. Her performance in the film was highly acclaimed and several critics noted her for showing great emotional range and depth. Mimmy Jain of The Indian Express, in a positive review, wrote: "As the young girl who is sick of the suspense and disruption that her brother's disappearance has caused in her family's life, as the obstinate daughter who will not listen to her mother's plea to let her keep hoping for her son, as the determined sister who keeps on in her hunt for her brother despite all odds and then seeks to keep him on the right path, this is a new Karisma, and one that delivers a superbly flawless performance."

In 2001, she achieved further critical acclaim for her portrayal of a real life actress in the biographical drama Zubeidaa. Directed by Shyam Benegal, the film was based on the life of ill-fated actress Zubeida Begum, who married a Sikh, Hanwant Singh. The Tribune complimented her by arguing that she "has surpassed herself as the passionate, defiant, willful and troubled Zubeidaa, the truly modern woman." In an interview with Rediff she explained: "I have been here so long, I have done everything. lead roles, supporting roles, everything. How do I grow as a performer? If I keep doing commercial cinema, I will stagnate and I wanted to grow". For her work, she was awarded the Best Actress (Critics) and also garnered a Best Actress nomination at the ceremony. She next starred alongside Bobby Deol and Rahul Dev in Indra Kumar's Aashiq – the movie received little praise from critics, though it proved to be a modest success, grossing over  domestically. Suneel Darshan's social drama Ek Rishtaa: The Bond of Love was Kapoor's next release. Co-starring Amitabh Bachchan and Akshay Kumar, the film became one of the biggest hits of the year.

In 2002, Kapoor had three film releases, the first of which was the romantic drama Haan Maine Bhi Pyaar Kiya, opposite Akshay Kumar and Abhishek Bachchan. She next starred alongside Nana Patekar in the woman-centric drama Shakti: The Power, playing the role of Nandini, a woman who wants to fly away from her in-laws (involved in feudal gang wars) along with her son, after her husband's death. The film, a remake of the Telugu film Antahpuram (1998), was itself based on the life of author Betty Mahmoody. Shakti: The Power was critically acclaimed and also earned Kapoor highly positive reviews for her portrayal – Taran Adarsh reviewed: "The power clearly belongs to Kapoor. Breathing fire and venom to win back her son from the clutches of a despot, the actress gives it all to the character of a helpless mother and proves what a virtuoso performer she is. Playing the part of a wounded tigress, this is one performance that overshadows all the performances the year has seen so far". Kapoor's work in the film earned her Best Actress nominations at several award ceremonies, including a fifth nomination at Filmfare. Her final release that year was Indra Kumar's romantic drama Rishtey, alongside Anil Kapoor and Shilpa Shetty. She featured as Komal, a wealthy woman who falls in love with a poorer man and marries him against her father's wishes. Despite much anticipation, Kapoor's all three releases that year underperformed at the box office.

Recent work and expansion (2003–present) 

In 2003, she starred in Baaz: A Bird in Danger, which was her only release that year. However, the film performed poorly at the box-office. Later in the same year, she made her television debut in the Sahara One soap opera Karishma – The Miracles of Destiny, in which she played a dual role of a grandmother and granddaughter. The serial ended after 260 episodes in 2004 and she took a sabbatical from full-time acting for several years.

In 2006, Kapoor was seen in Mere Jeevan Saathi – the film had been shot and completed in 2003, but was delayed for three years. In 2008, alongside actor Arjun Rampal and director–choreographer Farah Khan, Kapoor began judging season four of the dance show Nach Baliye, and continued the following year with the comedy show Hans Baliye. In addition, she had a cameo in the song "Deewangi Deewangi" from the 2007 melodrama Om Shanti Om, and in 2008, was as a guest on the reality television show Wife Bina Life (2010).

Kapoor made her comeback as an actress with a leading role in Vikram Bhatt's supernatural thriller Dangerous Ishhq. Co-starring Rajneesh Duggal, the film spans a period of four centuries and tells four different love stories set in different time periods. Kapoor played four characters, one from each century. A major critical and box office failure, the film generated positive reviews for Kapoor's portrayal. Taran Adarsh of Bollywood Hungama commented: "Kapoor puts forth her best efforts, getting to deliver lines in varied dialects. She gets the dialects right, especially Urdu and Rajasthani, but there's not much scope for her to display her acting prowess". In 2013, Kapoor made a special appearance along with several other actors in the titular song of the anthology film Bombay Talkies, which was made to honour the Hindi film industry for completing a centenary. In 2019, Kapoor made a special appearance in the Aanand L. Rai-directed romantic comedy Zero. As of March 2020, Kapoor has finished working on the web-series Mentalhood for ALTBalaji.

Kapoor will mark her screen comeback after 6 years with Homi Adajania's Murder Mubarak.

Personal life 
Kapoor was in a relationship with her Jigar co-star Ajay Devgn from 1992 till they broke up in 1995. She got engaged to Abhishek Bachchan in 2002, but the engagement was called off after a few months. This ended their relationship of a few years and no reason was given for the break-up.

On 29 September 2003, she married industrialist Sunjay Kapur, the CEO of Sixt India, in a high-profile Sikh wedding ceremony at her ancestral home, Krishna Raj Bungalow, in Mumbai. The couple has a daughter, born in 2005 and a son, born in 2010. In 2014, the couple filed for divorce through mutual consent. In November 2015, the couple had filed applications to withdraw their consent to it. The couple's divorce was finalised in 2016.

On taking a break from her acting career for her kids and family, Kapoor said, it was a "conscious decision". She further said,

Off-screen work 
Kapoor supports her close friend Salman Khan's charitable trust Being Human Foundation. In 2005, along with other Bollywood stars, Kapoor performed at the HELP! Telethon Concert, raising money for the victims of the 2004 Indian Ocean earthquake. In 2010, Kapoor, along with Salman Khan and several other Bollywood actresses walked at the HDIL India Couture Week, for a charity cause. Kapoor was a goodwill ambassador for Pinkathon 2012 for breast cancer awareness.         In 2013, Kapoor participated in a campaign with Priyanka Chopra to highlight the rights of girls in India.

Kapoor has also been a celebrity endorser for many brands, including Kellogg's, Crescent Lawn, Admix Retail, Danone and Garnier Colour. She walked the runway for such designers as Manish Malhotra, Arpita Mehta, and Vikram Phadnis. 

Kapoor has been part of several stage shows and world tours since the '90s. The Heartthrobs: Live in Concert was performed across the United States and Canada alongside Arjun Rampal, Hrithik Roshan, Kareena Kapoor and Aftab Shivdasani. In 2016, Kapoor participated in the Hiru Golden Film Awards in Sri Lanka as a special guest along with several other Bollywood actors, including Neil Nitin Mukesh, Suniel Shetty (Sunil Shetty), Jackie Shroff, Sridevi, and Madhuri Dixit.

Kapoor is a shareholder in the children’s product company, Babyoye.com, an ecommerce startup specialising in selling infant- and mother-care products. In 2013, she wrote a book "My Yummy Mummy Guide: From Getting Pregnant to losing all the weight and beyond", a guide to motherhood filed with post pregnancy tips for women.

Reception and public image 
Kapoor is considered in the media as one of the most popular actresses of Bollywood. Filmfares Deven Sharma termed Kapoor "a force to reckon with commercially", he noted, "Karisma Kapoor was a strong contender to both Madhuri Dixit and Sridevi’s domination to the ’90s." She has been described by The Tribune as "possessing exuberance and energy". Her beauty and performances have made her a style icon. Nikita Sawant of Femina feels Kapoor embodies the statement, "Some people get better with age". Times of India termed her "inimitable" due to her body of work and the essence that she brought into movies in the 90s. 

India Today named her in their "Top Bollywood Actresses" list. In 2022 and 2023, she was voted "Sexiest Actress Alive" by the Glamour Magazine. Kapoor appeared on Box Office India's list of three "Top Actresses" for five consecutive years and ranked first for three years i.e. 1996, 1997 and 1999. In its "All Time Top Actresses" list, she ranked 8th. In 2013, she ranked 4th in The Times of Indias "50 Beautiful Faces" list.

Kapoor's sister Kareena Kapoor admits, "Working with Lolo will be a dream come true. She was and will always be my favorite actress." According to Rediff.com, she became "choosy about her roles" post a slew of out-and-out commercial films. NDTV termed her "The OG Bollywood Queen". Filmfare terms her as one of the "most celebrated stars" in the Hindi film industry. The Hindu said that she is blessed with "a radiant look and an enviable figure". Kapoor is widely praised for her performance in Raja Hindustani , Dil To Pagal Hai, Biwi No.1, Fiza, Zubeidaa and Shakti: The Power. Eastern Eye noted that Kapoor's filmography is filled with "an array of successful films".

Rediff.com said that Kapoor did everything from "raunchy numbers" to "serious roles". It credited her serious roles as the factor that consolidated her position as an "established actress". In an interview, Kapoor said,

Accolades 
Kapoor is the recipient of a National Film Award for Best Supporting Actress for Dil To Pagal Hai (1997), and four Filmfare Awards: Best Actress for Raja Hindustani (1996) and Fiza (2000), Best Supporting Actress for Dil To Pagal Hai (1997), and Best Actress (Critics) for Zubeidaa (2001).

In 1996, Kapoor earned her first Best Actress for Raja Hindustani, her biggest commercial success, and later received the National Film Award for Best Supporting Actress and the Filmfare Award for Best Supporting Actress for her performance in the musical romantic drama Dil To Pagal Hai (1997). She went on to play the leading role in the critically acclaimed projects, Fiza (2000) and Zubeidaa (2001), for which she earned the Best Actress and Best Actress (Critics) trophies at the Filmfare Awards.

See also 
 Kapoor Family

References

External links 

 
 
 

1974 births
Living people
Karisma
Indian film actresses
Indian television actresses
Punjabi people
Sindhi people
Indian people of English descent
Actresses of European descent in Indian films
Actresses in Hindi cinema
Best Supporting Actress National Film Award winners
Filmfare Awards winners
International Indian Film Academy Awards winners
Zee Cine Awards winners
Actresses from Mumbai
20th-century Indian actresses
21st-century Indian actresses
Anglo-Indian people
Cathedral and John Connon School alumni